Type 926 submarine support ship with NATO reporting name Dalao is a class of submarine rescue and supply ship developed by China for the People's Liberation Army Navy (PLAN), and as of mid-2014, a total of three are in service. This ship is capable of both replenishing submarines and rescuing submariners in distress.

With a displacement of 9500 tons, the Type 926 carries newly designed rescue chambers that are capable of performing rescue missions to a depth of three hundred meters, being able to rescue a maximum of eighteen submariners each dive. One of these ships carries a deep-submergence rescue vehicle (DSRV) imported from the United Kingdom, the LR7, which is a development of the earlier LR5. The LR7 is also capable of rescuing a total of eighteen submariners each dive and the 25-ton DSRV can perform rescue operations at five hundred meters depth and continuously working under water for four days. The rest of the ships carry the successor of  the Type 7103 DSRV designed by Harbin Engineering University.

References

Auxiliary search and rescue ship classes
Auxiliary ships of the People's Liberation Army Navy
Submarine rescue ships